The 18th Congress of the Philippines, composed of the Philippine Senate and House of Representatives, met from July 22, 2019, until June 1, 2022, during the last three years of Rodrigo Duterte's presidency. The convening of the 18th Congress followed the 2019 general elections, which replaced half of the Senate membership and the entire membership of the House of Representatives.

Leadership

Senate 
Senate President:
Tito Sotto (NPC), July 22, 2019 – June 30, 2022
Senate President pro tempore:
Ralph Recto (Nacionalista), July 22, 2019 – June 30, 2022
Majority Floor Leader: 
Migz Zubiri (Independent), July 22, 2019 – June 30, 2022
Minority Floor Leader:
Franklin Drilon (Liberal), July 22, 2019 – June 30, 2022

House of Representatives 

 Speakers:
Alan Peter Cayetano (Taguig-Pateros, Nacionalista), July 22, 2019 – October 13, 2020
Lord Allan Jay Velasco (Marinduque, PDP–Laban), October 13, 2020 – June 1, 2022
 Deputy Speakers:
Paolo Duterte (Davao City–1st, NUP/HTL), July 22, 2019 – October 13, 2020
 Ferdinand Hernandez (South Cotabato–2nd, PDP–Laban), July 22, 2019 – June 1, 2022
 Evelina Escudero (Sorsogon–1st, NPC), July 22, 2019 – June 1, 2022
 Loren Legarda (Antique–Lone, NPC), July 22, 2019 – June 1, 2022
 Conrado Estrella III (Abono), July 22, 2019 – June 1, 2022
 Prospero Pichay Jr. (Surigao del Sur–1st, Lakas), July 22, 2019 – June 1, 2022
 Roberto Puno (Antipolo–1st, NUP), July 22, 2019 – June 1, 2022
 Eddie Villanueva (CIBAC), July 22, 2019 – June 1, 2022
 Aurelio D. Gonzales Jr. (Pampanga–3rd, PDP–Laban),  July 22, 2019 – December 7, 2020
 Johnny Pimentel (Surigao del Sur–2nd, PDP–Laban), July 22, 2019 – December 7, 2020
 Luis Raymund Villafuerte (Camarines Sur–2nd, Nacionalista), July 22, 2019 – October 14, 2020
 Raneo Abu (Batangas–2nd, Nacionalista), July 22, 2019 – November 18, 2020
 Neptali Gonzales II (Mandaluyong–Lone, PDP–Laban), July 22, 2019 – June 1, 2022
 Danilo Fernandez (Laguna–1st, PDP–Laban), July 22, 2019 – November 18, 2020
 Rosemarie Arenas (Pangasinan–3rd, PDP–Laban), July 29, 2019 – June 1, 2022
 Rodante Marcoleta (SAGIP), July 29, 2019 – June 1, 2022
 Henry Oaminal (Misamis Occidental–2nd, Nacionalista), July 29, 2019 – June 1, 2022
 Pablo John Garcia (Cebu–3rd, NUP/One Cebu), July 29, 2019 – June 1, 2022
 Vilma Santos-Recto (Batangas–6th (Lipa), Nacionalista), August 13, 2019 – June 1, 2022
 Deogracias Victor Savellano (Ilocos Sur–1st, Nacionalista), August 13, 2019 – June 1, 2022
 Mujiv Hataman (Basilan–Lone, Liberal), August 13, 2019 – June 1, 2022
 Mikee Romero (1-PACMAN), August 13, 2019 – October 2, 2020; October 14, 2020 – June 1, 2022
 Fredenil Castro (Capiz–2nd, Lakas), October 2, 2020 – November 18, 2020
 Paulino Salvador Leachon (Oriental Mindoro–1st, PDP–Laban), October 14, 2020 – June 1, 2022
 Lito Atienza (Buhay), November 18, 2020 – June 1, 2022
 Rufus Rodriguez (Cagayan de Oro–2nd, CDP), November 18, 2020 – June 1, 2022
 Arnolfo Teves Jr. (Negros Oriental–3rd, PDP–Laban), December 7, 2020 – June 1, 2022
 Benny Abante (Manila–6th, NUP/Asenso Manileño), December 7, 2020 – June 1, 2022
 Weslie Gatchalian (Valenzuela–1st, NPC), December 7, 2020 – June 1, 2022
 Eric Martinez (Valenzuela–2nd, PDP–Laban), December 7, 2020 – June 1, 2022
 Juan Pablo Bondoc (Pampanga–4th, PDP–Laban), December 7, 2020 – June 1, 2022
 Bernadette Herrera-Dy (Bagong Henerasyon), December 7, 2020 – June 1, 2022
 Divina Grace Yu (Zamboanga del Sur–1st, PDP–Laban), December 7, 2020 – June 1, 2022
 Rogelio Pacquiao (Sarangani–Lone, PDP–Laban), December 7, 2020 – June 1, 2022
 Kristine Singson-Meehan (Ilocos Sur–2nd, Bileg), December 7, 2020 – June 1, 2022
 Strike Revilla (Cavite–2nd (Bacoor), NUP), December 14, 2020 – June 1, 2022
 Isidro Ungab (Davao City–3rd, HNP), December 16, 2020 – June 1, 2022
 Abraham Tolentino (Cavite–8th, NUP), December 16, 2020 – June 1, 2022
 Camille Villar (Las Piñas–Lone, Nacionalista), February 2, 2021 – June 1, 2022
 Marlyn Alonte-Naguiat (Biñan–Lone, PDP–Laban), March 25, 2021 – June 1, 2022
 Majority Floor Leader:
 Martin Romualdez (Leyte–1st, Lakas), July 22, 2019 – June 1, 2022
 Minority Floor Leader: 
Benny Abante (Manila–6th, NUP/Asenso Manileño), July 22, 2019 – October 16, 2020
Joseph Stephen Paduano (Abang Lingkod), October 19, 2020 – June 1, 2022

Sessions 

 First regular session: July 22, 2019 – June 5, 2020
July 22–October 4, 2019
October 5–November 3, 2019
November 4–December 20, 2019
January 20–March 13, 2020
March 14–May 3, 2020
First special session: March 23, 2020
May 4–June 5, 2020
Second regular session: July 27, 2020 – June 4, 2021
July 27–October 12, 2020
Second special session: October 13–16, 2020 
November 16–December 18, 2020
January 18–March 26, 2021
May 17–June 4, 2021
Third regular session July 26, 2021 – June 3, 2022
July 26–September 30, 2021
November 8–December 17, 2021
January 17–February 4, 2022
May 23–June 1, 2022

Meeting places 

 Senate: GSIS Building, Pasay
 House of Representatives: Batasang Pambansa Complex, Quezon City
 Batangas City Convention Center, Batangas City (January 22, 2020)
 Celebrity Sports Plaza, Quezon City (October 12, 2020)

Composition 
Both chambers of Congress are divided into parties and blocs. While members are elected via parties, blocs are the basis for committee memberships. Only members of the majority and minority blocs are accorded committee memberships. This is how blocs are determined:
 Majority bloc: All members who voted for the Senate President or Speaker during the Senate presidential or speakership election.
 Minority bloc: All members who voted for the second-placed candidate during the Senate presidential or speakership election.
 Independent minority bloc: All members who did not vote for the winning or second-best nominee during the Senate presidential or speakership election.
 Independent bloc: All members who abstained from voting during the Senate presidential or speakership election.
 Not a member of any bloc: All members who have not voted during the Senate presidential or speakership election.

Senate

House of Representatives

Members

Senate 
Senators' terms elected in 2016 started on June 30, 2016, and ended on June 30, 2022; those elected in 2019 had their terms start on June 30, 2019, and end on June 30, 2025, unless stated otherwise.

Notes

House of Representatives 
Terms of members of the House of Representatives started on June 30, 2019, took office on July 22, 2019, and ended on June 30, 2022, unless stated otherwise.

District representatives 

Notes

Party-list representatives

Notes

Committees

Constitutional bodies

Senate committees

House of Representatives committees

Agenda

Death penalty
As of July 2019, bills seeking to reinstate capital punishment in the Philippines have been revived in the Senate ahead of the opening of the 18th Congress.

COVID-19 pandemic 

The 18th Congress enacted the Bayanihan to Heal as One Act and Bayanihan to Recover as One Act as response to the COVID-19 pandemic in the Philippines.

ABS-CBN franchise renewal 

In May 2020, the House of Representatives acted on the pending franchise renewal bills of ABS-CBN that has been pending since July 2019.

House Speakership crisis 

In 2020, the position of Speaker was disputed, which in the latter part of the year threatened the passage of a bill legislating the national government's budget for 2021. The dispute involved then-speaker and Pateros–Taguig representative Alan Peter Cayetano and Marinduque representative Lord Allan Velasco. This started in July 2019, when the two had a "term-sharing agreement" which was brokered by President Rodrigo Duterte. Under that deal, Cayetano would serve as House Speaker for the first 15 months of the 18th Congress, or until October 2020. Cayetano was to step down from his position as speaker in order to give way for the election of Velasco as speaker.

Cayetano, in March 2020, accused Velasco and his camp of a conspiracy to remove him from his position as House Speaker. Velasco denied Cayetano's allegation of supposed ouster plot, stating it "baseless." Cayetano initially oversaw deliberations on the 2021 national budget but tensions in the lower house of the Congress grew by September 2020. His camp abruptly ended sessions in which some legislators criticizing the move which prevented them from scrutinizing proposals on the 2021 budget.

Cayetano offered to resign but his camp claim that majority of the House of Representatives declined his resignation. On October 12, 2020, Lord Allan Velasco and some legislators convened at the Celebrity Sports Complex in Quezon City and conducted a house session where positions including the speakership was declared vacant and appointed Velasco as house speaker. Velasco's camp claimed that 186 lawmakers voted for his appointment as house speaker. Cayetano's camp declared the session a "travesty" and questioned the legality of the session itself. Cayetano maintained that he remains as house speaker. On the other hand, Cayetano called the appointment of Velasco as a speaker a "fake session" as he added that there was no prior plenary resolution authorizing the holding of a session outside the Batasang Pambansa and insists that the House of Representative mace used in the meeting is illegal.

On October 13, 2020, during the start of the special session of the House, Velasco's election as House Speaker last October 12, 2020 was formally ratified by 186 representatives assembled in the Batasang Pambansa. At the same time, Cayetano tendered his "irrevocable" resignation as House Speaker on his Facebook Live paving the way for Velasco to assume his position undisputed.

Changes in membership

House of Representatives

District representatives

Party-list representatives

Legislation

Republic Acts 

The 18th Congress passed a total of 311 bills which were signed into law by President Rodrigo Duterte. 119 of these laws were national in scope, while 192 were local:

Treaties 
One treaty has been approved by the Senate:

References

Congresses of the Philippines
Fifth Philippine Republic